Tree Without Fruit (Finnish: Hedelmätön puu) is a 1947 Finnish drama film directed by Hannu Leminen and starring Helena Kara, Rauli Tuomi and Joel Rinne.

Cast
 Helena Kara as Helena Tyrni  
 Rauli Tuomi as Erkki Tyrni  
 Joel Rinne as Tauno Sysikorpi  
 Rauha Rentola as Maija Raivio  
 Emma Väänänen as Hanna Palonen 
 Aino Lohikoski as Erkki's mother  
 Salli Karuna as Helena's mother  
 Enni Rekola as Mrs. Sandman  
 Elli Ylimaa as Ms. Lindgren  
 Matti Aulos as Antero Palonen  
 Arvi Tuomi as Harjula  
 Pentti Viljanen as Suomela  
 Ossi Elstelä as Peltonen  
 Uuno Montonen as Erkki's father  
 Sven Relander as Gynecologist 
 Mej-Ling Axberg as Hilkka  
 Irja Kuusla as Nurse  
 Lauri Kyöstilä as Doorman  
 Topo Leistelä 
 Ida Salmi as Head nurse  
 Annika Sipilä as Annika Palonen  
 Veikko Sorsakivi as Newspaperman  
 Elsa Turakainen as Mrs. Nilsson  
 William Reunanen as Man in hotel lobby  
 Urho Seppälä as Newspaperman 
 Kauko Vuorensola as Lift boy

References

Bibliography 
 Kari Uusitalo. T. J. Särkkä: legenda jo eläesään. WSOY, 1975.

External links 
 

1947 films
1947 drama films
Finnish drama films
1940s Finnish-language films
Finnish black-and-white films